A concentric crater fill (CCF) is a landform where the floor of a crater is mostly covered with many parallel ridges.  It is common in the mid-latitudes of Mars, and is widely believed to be caused by glacial movement. Areas on Mars called Deuteronilus Mensae and Protonilus Mensae contain many examples of concentric crater fill.

Description

Concentric crater fill, like lobate debris aprons and lineated valley fill, is believed to be ice-rich.  Sometimes boulders are found on concentric crater fill; it is believed they fell off the crater wall, then were transported away from the wall with the movement of the glacier. Erratics on Earth were carried by similar means.

High resolution pictures taken with HiRISE reveal that some of the surfaces of concentric crater fill are covered with strange patterns called closed-cell and open-cell brain terrain.  The terrain resembles a human brain.  It is believed to be caused by cracks in the surface accumulating dust and other debris, together with ice sublimating from some of the surfaces.  The cracks are the result of stress from gravity and seasonal heating and cooling.

See also

References

Surface features of Mars